Thayer Munford Jr. (born September 18, 1999) is an American football offensive tackle for the Las Vegas Raiders of the National Football League (NFL). He played college football at Ohio State.

Early life and high school career
Munford grew up in Cincinnati, Ohio and initially attended La Salle High School. Before his senior year, he moved to Massillon, Ohio and transferred to Massillon Washington High School who were coached by his former coach at La Salle, Nate Moore. Moore and his wife took legal custody of Munford shortly before his senior year. He was originally ruled ineligible by the Ohio High School Athletic Association after it was ruled that his transfer was a violation of the organization's recruiting rules. The ruling was later reversed and Munford was eligible for the final three games of the season. Munford was rated a four star recruit and committed to play college football at Ohio State over offers from Kentucky, Iowa, and Pittsburgh.

College career
Munford played as a reserve offensive lineman as a freshman. He was named a starter going into his sophomore season and started the first 13 games of the season before suffering a back injury. Munford started all of the Buckeyes games as a junior and was named second team All-Big Ten Conference. As a senior, he was named first team All-Big Ten after starting all seven of Ohio State's games in the team's COVID-19-shortened 2020 season. After considering entering the 2021 NFL Draft, Munford decided to utilize the extra year of eligibility granted to college athletes who played in the 2020 season due to the coronavirus pandemic and return to Ohio State for a fifth season. He was moved to left guard prior to the start of the season. Munford was named first team All-Big Ten and a first team All-American by the American Football Coaches Association in his final season. He moved back to the tackle position for the 2022 Rose Bowl, his last game at Ohio State, after Nicholas Petit-Frere opted out of the game to prepare for the NFL Draft.

Professional career

Munford was drafted by the Las Vegas Raiders in the seventh round, 238th overall, of the 2022 NFL Draft.

References

External links
 Las Vegas Raiders bio
Ohio State Buckeyes bio

Living people
American football offensive tackles
Players of American football from Cincinnati
Ohio State Buckeyes football players
All-American college football players
1999 births
Las Vegas Raiders players